The Laingsburg Local Municipality council consists of seven members elected by mixed-member proportional representation. Four councillors are elected by first-past-the-post voting in four wards, while the remaining three are chosen from party lists so that the total number of party representatives is proportional to the number of votes received.

In the election of 3 August 2016 no party obtained a majority; the African National Congress (ANC) and the Democratic Alliance (DA) won three seats each, and the Karoo Ontwikkelings Party (KOP; Karoo Development Party) won the remaining seat. Initially the DA and KOP formed a coalition to govern the municipality, but in March 2017 the KOP broke with the DA and formed a new coalition with the ANC.

In the election of 1 November 2021, again no party obtained a majority; with the Democratic Alliance (DA) winning three seats, and the Karoo Ontwikkelings Party losing all of its seats.

Results 
The following table shows the composition of the council after past elections.

December 2000 election

The following table shows the results of the 2000 election.

September 2004 floor crossing

In terms of the Eighth Amendment of the Constitution, in the period from 1–15 September 2004 councillors had the opportunity to cross the floor to a different political party without losing their seats. In the Laingsburg council, one councillor crossed from the Democratic Alliance (DA) to the African National Congress.

March 2006 election

The following table shows the results of the 2006 election.

September 2007 floor crossing
The final floor-crossing period occurred on 1–15 September 2007; floor-crossing was subsequently abolished in 2008 by the Fifteenth Amendment of the Constitution. In the Laingsburg council, the two councillors of the Laingsburg Gemeenskaps Party crossed to the National People's Party.

May 2011 election

The following table shows the results of the 2011 election.

August 2016 election

The following table shows the results of the 2016 election.

The local council sends one representative to the council of the Central Karoo District Municipality.  that councillor is from the Democratic Alliance.

November 2021 election

The following table shows the results of the 2021 election.

References

Laingsburg
Elections in the Western Cape